Mike Schaufler is a former Democratic member of the Oregon House of Representatives, representing District 48 from 2003 to 2013.

After growing up and graduating from high school in Webster City, Iowa, Mike developed an early interest in politics. He was an active participant in student council throughout his time in school, ultimately attending the University of Iowa to pursue a B.A. in Political Science. Upon completing his bachelor's degree in 1984, he moved to Oregon in 1988.

After arriving in Oregon, Mike worked as a Laborers' Union member, rank and file, from 1988–1996. Since 1996, Mike has successfully operated his own small business, working as a contractor.

During his time in Oregon, Mike's strong interest in politics drovehis involvement in local government, where he held numerous positions. His experience in public service exposed him to a wealth of issues and afforded him the opportunity to apply real solutions to make the community better.

Mike served in the following positions prior to his election to the Oregon House of Representatives in 2002:

Happy Valley City Council 1997-2000
Happy Valley Transportation Advisory Committee 1996
Metro's Joint Policy Advisory Committee on Transportation, Alternate
Clackamas County Concurrency Project, Transportation
League of Oregon Cities General Government Committee
Happy Valley Budget Committee
Happy Valley Planning Commission
Sunrise Water Authority Budget Committee
He carries this broad experience and passion with him as he runs for a fifth term as the representative of House District 48. His dedication to a bright future for his family resonates with his deep concerns for his constituents. Mike's efforts at the Capitol are aimed at ensuring a quality education for each child, along with strong working communities in Happy Valley and outer Southeast Portland.

In the fall of 2011, Schaufler was accused of groping a woman's breast at an AFL-CIO convention held in Eugene, Oregon. The incident was publicized in Oregon's premier newspaper, The Oregonian, and Schaufler's behavior was referred to as "highly inappropriate" by the State Labor Commissioner Brad Avakian. Shaufler later denied the incident by written statement, explaining, "A campaign worker and colleague of mine stuck a campaign sticker on my chest without my permission. I reacted by taking the sticker off of my chest and sticking it on her chest." Schaufler further described the incident as "innocent horseplay" and a "knee-jerk response."

Schaufler was also criticized for his record of siding with Republicans on various issues in the legislature, including stalling a healthcare bill. During Schaufler's campaign for the 2012 primary election, he was further criticized for accepting a $3,000 donation from the conservative Koch Industries, although Schaufler later returned the money after public backlash.

External links
Oregon State House - Mike Schaufler official government website
Project Vote Smart - Representative Mike Schaufler (OR) profile
Follow the Money - Mike Schaufler
2006 2004 2002 campaign contributions
 https://web.archive.org/web/20110721092516/http://www.dpo.org/people/mike-schaufler
"Rep. Mike Schaufler accused of groping woman at labor event in Eugene"
 
"Rep. Mike Schaufler says groping incident was "innocent horseplay""

"A Democrat defects in the Oregon House, stalls insurance bill"
 
"Critics tussle with Schaufler over Koch Industries contribution; Schaufler then returns cash"
 

1959 births
Living people
Members of the Oregon House of Representatives
21st-century American politicians
People from Buffalo, Minnesota